Lewis Scot was a Scottish buccaneer who, according to writer Alexander Esquemeling, was the first pirate to raid Spanish coastal settlements in the Caribbean and West Indies during the mid-seventeenth century.

Scot is especially known for his raid of the Spanish city of Campeche on Mexico's Yucatan Peninsula. After receiving a ransom for the city, he is said to have retired in Tortuga.

References

Year of birth missing
Year of death missing
English pirates
People of Saint-Domingue